Saint-Nicolas-la-Chapelle may refer to the following places in France:

Saint-Nicolas-la-Chapelle, Aube, in the Aube  département
Saint-Nicolas-la-Chapelle, Savoie, in the Savoie  département